Kolokytha ( "pumpkin", also known as Κολοκυθιά, Kolokythia) is a Greek islet. It is part of municipality Agios Nikolaos of the regional unit Lasithi, eastern Crete. It is located approximately 850 meters east of the Spinalonga peninsula and forms a bay with it.

See also
List of islands of Greece

References

Landforms of Lasithi
Islands of Crete
Islands of Greece